The Fiordland penguin (Eudyptes pachyrhynchus), also known as the Fiordland crested penguin (in Māori, tawaki or pokotiwha), is a crested penguin species endemic to New Zealand. It currently breeds along the south-western coasts of New Zealand's South Island as well as on Stewart Island/Rakiura and its outlying islands. Because it originally ranged beyond Fiordland, it is sometimes referred to as the New Zealand crested penguin.

Taxonomy 
The Fiordland crested penguin was described in 1845 by English zoologist George Robert Gray, its specific epithet derived from the Ancient Greek pachy-/παχυ- "thick" and rhynchos/ρύγχος "beak". It is one of six species in the genus Eudyptes, the generic name derived from the Ancient Greek eu/ευ "good" and dyptes/δύπτης "diver".

Description 

It has dark, bluish-grey upperparts with a darker head, and white underparts. Its broad, yellow eyebrow-stripe extends over the eye and drops down the neck. It can be distinguished from the similar erect-crested penguin (Eudyptes sclateri) and Snares penguin (Eudyptes robustus) in having no bare skin around the base of its bill. Female Fiordland penguins lay a clutch of two eggs where the first-laid egg is much smaller than the second egg, generally hatches later, and shows higher mortality, demonstrating a brood reduction system that is unique from other avian groups.

Distribution and habitat 
This penguin nests in colonies among tree roots and rocks in dense temperate coastal forest. It breeds along the shores in the West Coast of the South Island, south of about Bruce Bay and the Open Bay Islands, around Fiordland and Foveaux Strait, and on Stewart Island/Rakiura and its outlying islands. Fossils of this species have been found as far north as the northern end of the South Island, and they probably once nested in the North Island as well. Their range drastically reduced by hunting in Polynesian times, and they are now only found in the least-populated part of New Zealand. The species is also present in Australia.

Diet 
The main prey species reported are cephalopods (85%, mainly arrow squid, Nototodarus sloanii), followed by crustaceans (13%, primarily krill, Nyctiphanes australis) and fish (2%, mainly red cod and hoki). However, the importance of cephalopods might be exaggerated. Prey taken seems to vary between Codfish Island and northern Fiordland.

Conservation 
Fiordland crested penguins are classed as vulnerable to extinction by the IUCN, and their status was changed from vulnerable to endangered by the Department of Conservation in 2013. Surveys in the 1990s counted 2,500 pairs, though this was likely an underestimate; based on historic trends, the population is probably continuing to decline. The main threats are introduced predators such dogs, cats, rats, and especially stoats. They are also vulnerable to human disturbance, fleeing nests and leaving chicks exposed to predators.

References

External links 

 State of Penguins: Fiordland penguin – detailed and current species account of (Eudyptes pachyrhynchus) 
 The Tawaki Project - Current research project on Fiordland penguins
 Fiordland penguins from the International Penguin Conservation website
 Penguin World: Fiordland penguin
 www.pinguins.info information about all species of penguins

 Fiordland penguin - www.penguins.com.au
 Fiordland penguin discussed on RNZ Critter of the Week, 24 March 2017
Fiordland Crested Penguin, New Zealand Birds Online

Eudyptes
Penguins
Birds of the South Island
Fiordland
Vulnerable fauna of Oceania
Birds described in 1845
Taxa named by George Robert Gray
Endemic birds of New Zealand